This is a list of compositions by Lorenzo Perosi according to Mario Rinaldi (1967).

List of compositions

Oratorios (22)

La Passione di Cristo secondo S. Marco (1897)
La Trasfigurazione di Cristo (1898)
La Resurrezione di Lazzaro (1898)
La Resurrezione di Cristo (1898)
Il Natale del Redentore (1899)
L'entrata di Cristo in Gerusalemme (1900)
La Strage degli Innocenti (1900)
Mosè (1900)
Stabat Mater (1904)
Il Giudizio Universale (1904)
Dies Iste (1904)
Transitus Animae (1907)
In Patris Memoriam (1909)
Vespertina Oratio (1912)
Le Sette Parole di Nostro Signore Gesu' Cristo sulla Croce (1913)
La Samaritana (1913)
In Diebus Tribolationis (1916)
Il Sogno Interpretato (1928)
In Fratris Memoriam (1930)
In Transitu Sancti Patris Nostri Francisci (1937)
Natalitia (1937)
Il Nazareno (1950)

Masses (54)

Missa Davidica	(1894)
Missa Patriarcalis (1894)
Missa Brevis in Honorem BMV Sub Titulo Piratellii (1894)
Missa in Honorem Beati Ambrosii (1895)
Missa in Honorem Beati Gregori Barbarici (1897)
Missa in Honorem SS Gervasii et Protasii (1897)
Missa Te Deum Laudamus	(1897)
Missa Eucharistica (1897)
Missa Prima Pontificalis (1897)
Messa di Requiem (1897)
Missa Pro Defunctis (1898)
Missa Benedicamus Domino (1899)
Messa per la Canonizzazione del Beato Giovanni Battisa De La Salle (1900)
Messa di Requiem (1902)
Missa Leone XIII (1903)
Missa Secunda Pontificalis (1906)
Missa Pro Defunctis (1913)
Messa per l'anno Giubilare (1933)
Messa per Don Bosco (1934)
Messa Gregoriana di Requiem (1936)
Missa in Honorem Beata Cabrini	(1938)
Messa Pio XII (1942)
Missa in Honorem S. Scolastica	(1947)
Missa Emicat Meridies (1952)
Missa Cerviana	
Missa O Santissima	
Missa in Honorem S Franciscae Romanae	
Messa di Requiem	
Messa Pio X 	
Missa de Beata	
Missa Prima in Honorem Beati Caroli
Missa Secunda in Honorem Beati Caroli	
Missa Natalitia in Honorem S. Josephi Cottolengo	
Messa a cinque voci dispari (1894), lost
Messa corale di requiem (1895), lost
Messa Marciana	(1897), lost
Missa Prima Gregoriana	(1897), lost
Missa Praeconium Gloriarum (1897), lost
Messa in Suffraggio del Maestro Salvatore Meluzzi (1905), lost
Missa Secunda Gregoriana (1937), lost
Messa San Francesco Zaverio (1952), lost
Messa degli Ottant'anni (1952), lost
Messa S. Gregorio del Bufalo (1954), lost
Messa di Natale (only some parts survived)
Messa per la Circoncisione (only some parts survived)
Messa di Quaresima I domenica (only some parts survived)
Messa di Quaresima II domenica	 (only some parts survived)
Messa di Quaresima III domenica  (only some parts survived)
Messa per le Palme (only some parts survived)
Messa di Pasqua  (only some parts survived)
Messa per l'Ascensione	(only some parts survived)
Messa di Pentecoste (only some parts survived)
Messa Immacolata Gaudens Gaudebo  (only some parts survived)
Messa San Paolo  (only some parts survived)

Motets (342)

Acclamationes
Acclamationes Pio XI
Ad Nonam
Adoramus te
Adorna Thalamun
Ad Tertiam
Aeterna Coeli
A Gesu' Bambino
Alleluja e Graduale per la festa di San Marco
Alleluja e Graduale per la festa della Dedicazione
Al Signore levate o genti
Alma Redemptoris Mater, ad una voce. Melodie Sacre, Anno I, 1897
Amen
Animam meam dilectam
6 Antifone per la festa di San Marco
6 Antifone per la festa della Santa Famiglia
Ascendit Deus
Assoluzione
Assoluzione
Ave di Fatima
Ave Joseph
Ave Maria
Ave Maria
Ave Maria
Ave Maria
Ave Maris Stella
Ave Maris Stella
Ave Maris Stella
Ave Regina Coelorum
Ave Rex Noster
Ave Roche Sanctissime
Ave Verum
Beata Dei Genitrix
Beata Viscera
Beate Marce
Beati qui Lugent
Beatissimo Padre Nostro
Beatus Vir
Beatus Vir
Benedictus
Benedictus
Benedictus sit Deus Pater
Bonitatem
Cantabo Domino
Cantata dell'anima
Cantata in onore della beata Francesca Cabrini
Cantabus Domino
Canzoncine Sacre Popolari
Canzone della Madonna della Fiducia
Christus Factus est
Clamavi
Communio
Canfitebor
Canfitebor
Canfitebor
Confitemini Domini
Confitebor Tibi Domine
Cor Jesu Fragrans
Corpus Domini
Credidi
Credidi
Credo
Credo
Cum Appropinquarent
Decora Lux
De Profundis
Det Chatarina
Deus in Adjutorium
Deus Tuorum
Die Jahreszeiten von Dodenstidt
Dignare me
Discendite a Me maledicti
Dixit Dominus
Dixit Dominus
Dixit Dominus
Dixit Dominus
Dixit Dominus
Dixit Dominus
Domine Jesu Christe
Domus mea
Dormi Non Piangere
Ecce Panis
Ecce Sacerdos
Ecce Sacerdos Magnus
Ecce Sacerdos Magnus
Eram Quasi Agnus Innocens
Eucharistica
Exaudi Domine
Exultate Orbis
Fortem Virili
Gloria Laus
Graduale
Graduale dell'Ascensione
Gaudens Gaudebo
Hoc Est Corpus Meum
Hodie Nobis Coelorum Rex
Hodie Nobis De Coelo
Hymnis
Hymnus Sanctae Sipherusae
Iam Nostra
In Convertendo Dominus
In Convertendo Dominus
In Festis BMV
In Festis BMV per Annum
In Festo S. Hermangorae et Fortunati
Ingrediente Domino
In medio Ecclesiae
In Monte Oliveti
In nativitate Domini
Inni (10)
Chi mai Dolente…
Mille volte benedetta
O Pane del Ciel
Dormi non piangere
O bella mia speranza
Neve non tocca
Inno dei Santi
Signor che in Ciel
La fortuna
In canto dell'estate
Inni
Inno al Crocefisso della Cattedrale
Inno al Vescovo Tesorieri
Inno a Pio IX
Inno a San Cassiano
Inno per il Natale
Intende Nobis Domine
Introito
Introito, Graduale e Communio
Introito, Graduale e Communio
Introito, Graduale e Communio
Invocazione alla Vergine
Ioseph Celebrent
Iste Confessor
Iste Confessor
Iste Confessor
Iste Confessor
Jerusalem Surge
Jestorum Animae
Jesu Coronam Virginorum
Jesu Dulci Memoria
Jesu Redemptor
Jesu Redemptor
Jesu Redemptor
Jesum Tradit Impius
Jubilate Deo
Jubilate Deo
Justorum Animae
Laetatus sum in His
Laetatus sum in His
Lauda Jerusalem
Laudate Dominum
Laudate Dominum
Laudate in Cymbalis
Laudate Pueri
Laudate Pueri
Laudate Pueri
Laudate Pueri
Laudate Pueri
6 Laudi Spirituali
Legem Pone
Libera me
Litanie
Litanie
Litanie alla Madonna
Litanie alla Beata Vergine
Litanie Lauretane
Lodate Maria
Lode a maria
Magnificat
Magnificat
Magnificat
Magnificat
Magnificat
Magnificat
Magnificat
Magnificat
Magnificat
Magnificat
Magnificat
Magnificat
Magnificat
Marce
Maria Mater Gratiae
Meditazioni.
1. Ecce maria
2. Kyrie (ambrosiano)
3. Ascendo ad Patrem
4. Qui me confessis
5. Pacem habet (ambrosiano)
6. Hoc est praeceptum
7. Ave Maris Stella
8. Nunc Sanctae nobis Spiritus
9. Iste confessor
10. In exitu
11. Manum suam
12. Salutis humanae
13 Meditazioni sopra corali
Melodia per inno
Memento Domine
Memor tacet
Memento Esto
Mille volte benedetta
Miserere
Miserere
Misterium Ecclesiae
Mondo piu' per me non sei
4 Mottetti Encomiastici
8 Mottetti per il Natale
Mottetto a San Luigi
Mottetto a Santa Caterina da Siena
Mottetto per Gesu' Bambino
Mottetto per l'Avvento
Nisi Dominus
Nisi Dominus
Noi siam figli di Maria
Nunc Sanctae Nobis
Nunc Sanctae Nobis
O Amabile Maria
O Bella mia Speranza
O Clemens o Pia
O Cor Jesu
O del Cielo gran Regina
O Emmanuel
Offertorio in Missa Pro Defunctis
Offertorio per il Corpus Domini
Offertorio per il Santo Natale
Offertorio per I Santi
O Lux Beata Coelitum
O Magnum Mysterium

O Maria Concepta
O Pane del Ciel
O quam suavis est
Ora pro Nobis
Ora pro Nobis, Sancta Dei genitrix
O Redemptor
Oremus
Oremus pro Pontefice
Oremus pro Pontefice
Oremus pro Pontefice
O Rex gentium
O Roma nobilis
O Sacrum Convivium
O Sacrum Convivium
O Sacrum Convivium
O Sacrum Convivium
O Salutaris Hostia
O Salutaris Hostia
O Salutaris Hostia
O Salutaris Hostia
O Sanctissima Anima
O Sidus Feltricae
Ostende Nobis Domine
O Trinitas Domine
O Vergine Divina
Pane del Ciel
Pange Lingua
Pange Lingua
Pange Lingua
Pange Lingua
Pater Noster
Per la Festa dell'Addolorata
Placare Christe
Placare
Psalmodia Modulata
Puer Natus est
Quem Vidistis Pastores
Qui Ascendet
Qui Ascendet in Montem Domini
Quisquis es in Mensa
Recordare Domine
Reges Tharsis
Regina Coeli
Requiem
Respice
Responsori dei tre mattutini delle tenebre
4 Responsori per il natale
Rondinella Pellegrina
Rovate Colli Desuper
Sacerdotes Domini
Sacerdos et Pontifex
Sacerdos et Pontifex
Sacris Solemnis
Sacro Cuore
Sacrum Convivium
11 Salmi
Salutazione a San Giuseppe
Salve Regina
Salve Regina
Salve Regina
Sancta Maria Succurre Miseris
Sancta et Immaculata
Sanctorum Meritis
Sciogliamo un cantico
Sei pura sei pian
Sepulto Domino
Siam Rei di Mille Errori
Signor che in Ciel
Si Queris Miracula
Spes Nostra
Stabat Mater
Satuit ei Dominus
Sub Tuum Praesidium
T'adoriam ostia divina
Tantum ergo
Tantum ergo
Tantum ergo
Tantum ergo
Tantum ergo
Tantum ergo
Tantum ergo
Tantum ergo
Tantum ergo
Tantum ergo
Te Aeternum
Te Deum
Te Deum
Te Deum
Te Deum Laudamus
Te Deum per l'anno giubilare
Te Deum Solenne
Tenebrae Factae Sunt
Terribilis est
Tota Pulchra, ad una voce. Melodie Sacre, Anno I, 1897
Tota Pulchra es Maria
Tristes Erant
Tristis est Anima mea
Tu es Petrus
Tui Sunt Coeli
Turba
Unxit te Deus
Ut Inimicos Sactae Ecclesiae
Veni Creator
Veni Creator
Veni Creator
Veni Sancte Spiritus
Verbum Caro
Verbum Caro
Verbum Supernum
Verbum Supernum
Veritas mea
Vespri Solenni
Vexilla Regis Prodeunt
Victimae Paschali Laudes

Other vocal works (23)

Alla Madonna della Fiducia
Anno Santo
Canzone del Grillo
Coro di Fanciulli
Domine Salvum me Fac
Hispania Vivat!
Inno al Gran Sasso D'Italia
Inno alla Madonna della Misericordia
Inno alla Santa Infanzia
Inno a Santa Caterina e a San Francesco
Inno a Sant'Omobono
Inno Cattolico
Inno degli Orfani del Mare
Inno dei Pellegrini
Inno del Santo
Inno Eucaristico
Inno Eucaristico
Inno Mater Orphanorum
Mottetto
O Dei Cristiani Aiuto
O Padre nostro
O Sovrana
Quasi Palma Exaltata sum in Cades

Orchestral works (26)

Adagio per orchestra (1931)
Concerto per Clarinetto e Orchestra (1928)
Concerto per Grande Orchestra	
Concerto per pianoforte e orchestra (1916)
Concerto per piccola orchestra	(1901)
Concerto per violino e orchestra no. 1	(1903)
Concerto per violino e orchestra no. 2	(1916)
Dormi non piangere	
Gerusalemme	
La festa del villaggio	(1959)
Le ore di Londra	
Pastorale (1901)
Scherzo  (1901)
Roma	
Venezia	
Firenze	
Messina	
Verona	
Tortona	
Milano	
Torino	
Genova	
Napoli	
Tema Variato (1901)
Tema e variazioni per violino e orchestra	
Variazioni

Chamber works (34)

Duvunque il guardo io giro	
Elegia per violoncello	
Inno cattolico	
200 piccoli pezzi per clarinetto e pianoforte (1928)
Quartetto no. 1 (1928)
Quartetto no. 2	
Quartetto no. 3 (1930)
Quartetto no. 4	
Quartetto no. 5	
Quartetto no. 6	
Quartetto no. 7	
Quartetto no. 8	
Quartetto no. 9	
Quartetto no. 10	
Quartetto no. 11	
Quartetto no. 12	
Quartetto no. 13	
Quartetto no. 14	
Quartetto no. 15	
Quartetto no. 16	
Quartetto no. 17	
Quartetto no. 18 (1929)
Quintetto no. 1 (1930)
Quintetto no. 2	
Quintetto no. 3	
Quintetto no. 4	
Quintetto no. 5 (1931)
Sonata per violino e pianoforte	
Sonata per violoncello e pianoforte	
Suite in tre tempi (1898)
Tema con Variaziioni (1913)
Trio no. 1 (1900)
Trio no. 2 (1900)
Trio no. 3 (1900)

Keyboard (11)

Andantino	
Preludio	
Ad multos annos	
Centonum di pezzi per organo	
Fugato 	
Interludi per organo	
Interludio per organo	
13 Meditazioni per organo	
Preludio per organo (1958)
XX  Trii per organo (1894)
Litanie Lauretane per piano

Perosi, Lorenzo